"So in Love" is a popular song, written by Cole Porter, from his musical Kiss Me, Kate (opening on Broadway in 1948), which was based on Shakespeare's The Taming of the Shrew. It was sung in the show by Patricia Morison, reprised by Alfred Drake, and further popularized by Patti Page in 1949.

The Page recording was issued by Mercury Records as catalog number 5230, and first reached the Billboard chart on February 12, 1949, lasting two weeks and peaking at No. 13.

Other versions which were popular that year were by Gordon MacRae and Dinah Shore.

The song has been recorded by many other significant female singers, including Peggy Lee and Ella Fitzgerald.

Recorded versions

Julie Andrews – 1989
The Joe Ascione Quartet – Movin' Up! (2007)
Josephine Barstow & Thomas Hampson – 1990
Shirley Bassey – Shirley (1961)
Mimi Benzell – 1959
Vikki Carr – 1964
Rondi Charleston – 2001
Andy Cole – 1958
Chick Corea – 1989
Bing Crosby (with Vic Schoen's Orchestra) (recorded January 4, 1949; released by Decca Records as catalog number 24559, with the flip side “Why Can't You Behave?”)
Plácido Domingo – 1991
Tommy Dorsey & His Orch. (vocal: Denny Dennis) – 1948; released by RCA Victor Records as catalog number 20-3331, with the flip side “While the Angelus Was Ringing”
Alfred Drake (released by RCA Victor Records as catalog number 20-3352, with the flip side “Were Thine That Special Face”)
Alfred Drake & Anne Jeffreys (Broadway Revival) – 1965
Lara Fabian & Mario Frangoulis (feat. in the film "De-Lovely") – 2004
Eddie Fisher – 1955
Ella Fitzgerald – Ella Fitzgerald Sings the Cole Porter Songbook (1956)
Renée Fleming & Bryn Terfel on Fleming's album Under the Stars (2003)
The Four Lads – 1958
Sergio Franchi – RCA Victor album There Goes My Heart (1965)
Sergio Franchi – 1976
Lily Frost – 2006
Roberta Gambarini – Groovin' High Records – 2009
Lesley Garrett – 1996
Robert Goulet & Carol Lawrence (TV Production) – 1968
Gogi Grant & Howard Keel – 1959
Kathryn Grayson & Howard Keel (Film Soundtrack) – 1953; released by MGM Records as catalog number 30813, with the flip side “I Hate Men”
Jane Harvey (released by MGM Records as catalog number 10359, with the flip side “Always True to You in My Fashion”)
Dick Haymes – 1948
Edmund Hockridge & Janine Roebuck – 1996
Mark Jacoby
Jazz Orchestra of the Delta – Big Band Reflections of Cole Porter (2003)
Betty Johnson
Allan Jones with orchestra conducted by Robert Armbruster. Recorded in Hollywood on April 26, 1950. It was released by EMI on the His Master's Voice label as catalog number BD 6085.
Stan Kenton
Dave King – I'll Be Ringing You (2012)
Lisa Kirk – 1953
k.d. lang – Red Hot + Blue (1990)
Mario Lanza
Steve Lawrence
Peggy Lee – 1958
Liane & The Boheme Bar Trio – 1959
Guy Lombardo's Orchestra (recorded January 24, 1949; released by Decca Records as catalog number 24572, with the flip side “Here I'll Stay”)
Julie London – 1965
Joe Loss and His Orchestra. Recorded in London on January 29, 1950. It was released by EMI on the His Master's Voice label as catalog number BD 6088
Lulu – 1965
Patti LuPone – 2005
Gordon MacRae – 1949; released by Capitol Records as catalog number 1684, with the flip side “Ramona”
Sue Matthews – 1993
Marin Mazzie & Brian Stokes Mitchell (Broadway Revival) – 1999
Nichola McAuliffe & Paul Jones (London Revival) – 1987
Robert Merrill & Roberta Peters
Vaughn Monroe (released by RCA Victor Records as catalog number 20-4171, with the flip side “I Concentrate on You”)
Diana Montague & Thomas Allen – 1993
Patricia Morison & Alfred Drake (Broadway Production) – 1948
Patricia Morison & Alfred Drake (TV Production) – 1958
Patricia Morison & Alfred Drake – 1959
Patricia Morison & Bill Johnson (London Production) – 1951
Joan Morris – 1988
Mika Ohashi – 1988
Georg Ots
Patti Page – 1949; released by Mercury Records as catalog number 5230, with the flip side “Where's That Man?”
Johnny Prophet – 1963
Tito Puente – 1960
John Raitt
Patricia Routledge & David Holliday – 1967
Diane Schuur – 2005
Dinah Shore (recorded December 1948; released by Columbia Records as catalog number 38399, with the flip side “Always True to You in My Fashion”)
Cesare Siepi – 1958 and 1964
Frank Sinatra & Keely Smith – 1963
Dakota Staton – 1961
Enzo Stuarti
Kiri Te Kanawa – 1985
Clare Teal – Don't Talk (2004)
Trio Désolé feat. Lorraine Caron on their album Sweet Surrende (2013)
Leslie Uggams – So in Love! (1963)
Jerry Vale – 1966
Marlene VerPlanck
Caetano Veloso – Foreign Sound (2004)
Dinah Washington
Deborah 'DeDe' Wedekind – Clear Skies Ahead (2011)
Julie Wilson
Will Wright
Earl Wrightson – 1962
Rachel York & Brent Barrett (London Revival) – 2002}
Tony Bennett – Love for Sale (2021)

References

1948 songs
Songs written by Cole Porter
Songs from Kiss Me, Kate
Ella Fitzgerald songs
Patti Page songs
Vikki Carr songs